The Leemon Formation is a geologic formation in Missouri. It preserves fossils dating back to the Ordovician period.

See also

 List of fossiliferous stratigraphic units in Missouri
 Paleontology in Missouri

References
 

Ordovician Missouri
Ordovician southern paleotemperate deposits